Ragya Naik was an Indian politician. He represented the Devarakonda constituency in Nalgonda as an Indian National Congress party legislator. 

He was gunned down on 29 December 2001, by People's War Group militants while on a visit to his village Maddimadugu in Mahbubnagar

References 

Indian politicians
Indian National Congress (Organisation) politicians
Telangana politicians
2001 deaths
Year of birth missing